Kristi Qarri (born 13 December 2000) is an Albanian professional footballer who plays as a goalkeeper for Albanian club Vllaznia Shkodër in Kategoria Superiore.

Career statistics

Club

References

External links

Kristi Qarri profile FSHF.org
Profile - Vllaznia

2000 births
Living people
Footballers from Shkodër
Albanian footballers
Association football goalkeepers
KF Vllaznia Shkodër players
Kategoria Superiore players
Kategoria e Dytë players